Melt Away: A Tribute to Brian Wilson is the eighth studio album by American musical duo She & Him, a collaboration between Zooey Deschanel and M. Ward.  The album was released by Fantasy Records on July 22, 2022. It is a tribute to Brian Wilson, co-founder of the Beach Boys, featuring covers of Beach Boys songs written by Wilson, in addition to featuring Brian Wilson on the track "Do It Again".

Critical reception

Riff felt that the "album's 14 tracks find a sweet spot between the sunny, fun-fun-fun façade of Wilson's music and the anxieties and melancholy that anchor it", while American Songwriter reviewed that "it's an unorthodox tack for a tribute, but it's one that still resonates well."

Track listing

Personnel
 Zooey Deschanel – Vocals and Vocal Arrangements
 M. Ward – Vocals, Guitars, Keys, Vocoder and Musical Arrangements
 Brian Wilson – Vocals on "Do It Again"
 Jose Medeles – Drums (except "Wouldn't It Be Nice") and Percussion
 Danny Frankel – Drums on "Wouldn't It Be Nice"
 John Perrin – Drums on "Do It Again"
 Joey Spampinato – Bass
 Paul Brainard – Pedal Steel and Trumpet
 Mark Powers – Percussion

Charts

References

The Beach Boys tribute albums
2022 albums
Brian Wilson
She & Him albums
Fantasy Records albums